Hammam Dhalaâ District is a district of M'Sila Province, Algeria.

Municipalities
The district is further divided into 4 municipalities:

Hammam Dhalaa
Tarmount
Ouled Mansour
Ouanougha

District of M'Sila Province